Abacidus is a genus of beetles in the family Carabidae, containing the following species:

 Abacidus atratus (Newman, 1838)
 Abacidus fallax (Dejean, 1828)
 Abacidus hamiltoni (G.horn, 1880)
 Abacidus permundus (Say, 1830)
 Abacidus sculptus (Leconte, 1852)

References

Pterostichinae